John Glenn Beall Jr. (June 19, 1927March 24, 2006) was an American Republican politician and businessman from the state of Maryland who served in the United States House of Representatives, representing  (1969–1971), and as a United States Senator from Maryland (1971–1977). He was also a member of the Maryland House of Delegates (1962–1968).

Life and career
Beall was born in Cumberland, Maryland, the eldest of three. His father was James Glenn Beall, who served as U.S. Representative from Maryland's 6th congressional district (1943–1953) and as a U.S. Senator from Maryland (1953–1965). His younger brother, George Beall, served as United States Attorney for the District of Maryland  (1970–1975), and in 1973, prosecuted Vice President Spiro Agnew for bribery.

Beall served in the United States Navy from 1945 to 1946, and graduated from Yale University in 1950. While at Yale, he was an active member of the Yale Political Union. He then went into the insurance business as a member of the general insurance firm of Beall, Garner & Geare, Inc.

In 1962, Beall was elected as a Republican to the Maryland House of Delegates and was re-elected in 1966. He served as minority floor leader from 1963 until his 1968 election to the 91st Congress.

Beall served one term in the U.S. House, representing , and then ran for the U.S. Senate in 1970, narrowly defeating incumbent Democrat Joseph Tydings. Six years later, he lost re-election to Paul Sarbanes by 39% to 57%. His eighteen-point margin of defeat was one of the widest for an incumbent senator in U.S. history. With Aris T. Allen as his running mate, Beall ran for Governor of Maryland in 1978, but lost to Democratic nominee Harry Hughes by an overwhelming margin.

In the Senate, Beall "sponsored legislation that created the Senate Budget Office and the Congressional Budget Office. He served as one of the first members of the Senate Budget Committee. He was a principal sponsor of The Physician Manpower Shortage Act, which brought more doctors to rural areas, and the C&O Canal Development Act, establishing the Chesapeake and Ohio Canal National Historical Park, among others."

Beall served as the President and Chairman of the charity The League for Crippled Children from 1978 until the time of his death.

Beall resumed the insurance business in Cumberland, and was very active in the local community until his death as a result of cancer.  He is interred in Frostburg Memorial Park Cemetery.

References

Notes

1927 births
2006 deaths
20th-century American politicians
American businesspeople in insurance
Deaths from cancer in Maryland
Republican Party members of the Maryland House of Delegates
Military personnel from Maryland
Politicians from Cumberland, Maryland
Republican Party United States senators from Maryland
Republican Party members of the United States House of Representatives from Maryland
United States Navy personnel of World War II
Yale University alumni
Beall family of Maryland
Businesspeople from Cumberland, Maryland